Acrarmostis is a monotypic moth genus of the family Erebidae. Its only species, Acrarmostis dryopa, is known from New Guinea. Both the genus and the species were first described by Edward Meyrick in 1889.

References

Hypeninae
Noctuoidea genera
Monotypic moth genera